The Pete Snodden Breakfast Show is the breakfast show on Cool FM in Northern Ireland, presented by Pete Snodden along with Paulo Ross and Rebecca McKinney. It originally aired from 2004 until 2 November 2012 and returned on 2 June 2014. It airs from 6:00am to 10:00am on weekdays.

2004–2012
Pete's team of co-presenters on the original show included Kirstie McMurray and sports presenter Nigel Ringland.

Features on the show include:
School Run Spy

The show was Northern Irelands biggest commercial radio show when it came off the air originally in 2012. On Monday 15 October, It was announced the show would be ending and ended on Friday 2 November 2012. The show was replaced with "Cool Breakfast" hosted by Gareth Stewarts and Connor Phillips while Snodden hosted Snodden Show on Cool FM.

2014–present
The show returned on 2 June 2014 as part of a major reshuffle at Cool FM.

Paulo Ross co-presents alongside Snodden. Rebecca McKinney joined in 2015.

References

British radio breakfast shows
Bauer Radio
Radio stations in Northern Ireland
Mass media in County Down
Newtownards